The Xiaomi Mi A1 (also known as Xiaomi Mi 5X in China), is a smartphone co-developed by Google—as part of its Android One initiative—and Xiaomi that runs on the Android operating system.

Specifications

Hardware 

Mi A1 comes with a 5.5" touchscreen display with Full HD 1080p resolution, powered by a 3080 mAh battery. It measures 155.40 × 75.80 × 7.30 (height × width × thickness) and weighs 165.00 grams. The phone is powered by a 2.0 GHz Octa-core Qualcomm Snapdragon 625 processor with 14 nm FinFET with Adreno 506 650 MHz GPU, and comes with 4GB of RAM. It has an internal storage of 32/64GB, and unique for the series, microSD card slot (hybrid slot) supporting up to 128GB cards. The rear camera on the Mi A1 is 12MP 1.25μm f/2.2 + 12MP 1.0 μm, 2.6 shooters with autofocus and 2× optical lossless zoom, Two-tone Flash and a 5-piece lens, it is capable of recording HD and 4k videos, the phone also has a 5MP 1.12μm, 2 front camera. Sensors on the phone include compass magnetometer, proximity sensor, accelerometer, ambient light sensor, gyroscope, fingerprint sensor, Infrared  and Hall Sensor

Software 
The Xiaomi Mi A1 ships with Android 7.1.2 Nougat and can be updated to Android 9 Pie. Besides Google software, the phone comes with Xiaomi's applications such as Camera, FeedBack, Mi Community and Mi Remote. The Mi A1 will receive OS upgrades for a minimum of two years. 
The Android Oreo update does not bring a project Treble functionality for device independent system updates. The device's kernel sources were released in January 2018, 4 months after its release. Mi A1 has an active developing community in XDA forums (for users who want to root their device and flash custom ROMs).

Mi 5X 
The Mi 5X is the Chinese market version of the Mi A1, running MIUI over Android. The 5X only differs in its software, having identical hardware to the A1.

Release 
The Xiaomi Mi A1 was unveiled on 5 September 2017 and it is available in all of Xiaomi's current markets, with the exception of the People's Republic of China, where the Mi 5X MIUI based variant of the phone was released earlier that year.

Reception 
Xiaomi Mi A1 received mostly positive reviews. Sam Byford of The Verge described Mi A1's most distinct feature is its software that runs on stock Android and not on Xiaomi's MIUI layer. Sahil Gupta of TechRadar wrote that Mi A1's Android One certified experience along with tried and tested hardware, and dual camera capability gives you the premium feel under a budget.

The phone has been described as 'giving a resurgence' to the Android One program, being the first Android One phone to be sold worldwide, and the first Android One phone by a top-5 bestselling smartphone brand. It was also the first mid-range priced phone to feature a dual rear camera setup with a zoom lens.

Issues 

At the end of 2017, Android Oreo was released and created major battery draining issues on some devices. Xiaomi claimed they were aware of the issue and said they would be working on a fix, but it never arrived.

Another issue was the dropping of Wi-Fi connections.

References

External links 
 

Android (operating system) devices
Xiaomi smartphones
Mobile phones introduced in 2017
Mobile phones with multiple rear cameras
Mobile phones with 4K video recording
Discontinued smartphones
Mobile phones with infrared transmitter